William Beatson (1807 – 13 January 1870) was a London-trained architect who immigrated to New Zealand. He adapted contemporary English building design to meet the rigors of the New Zealand environment.

Biography
William Beatson was born in Rotherhithe, Surrey, in 1807, the son of David Beatson (1775–1859) and Harriet Beatson née Whalesby (1780–1830). The Beatson family were well known in London's shipping industry. David Beatson arrived in London from Fife, Scotland, in about 1790, to join his cousins who were shipbreakers at Rotherhithe. By 1820, David was shipbreaking at Surrey Canal Wharf, eventually passing the business on to his oldest son, John Beatson (1802–1858). 
In 1838, the Beatson family enjoyed a dinner party aboard the historic HMS Temeraire as she was towed up the Thames to Beatson's breaking yard.

It has been suggested that William Beatson was educated at Eton; however, he is not recorded at Eton and it is more likely that he attended King's College, London, London.   William pursued a career in architecture under the tutorship of John Wallen and in 1830, he married John's daughter, Maria Wallen, at Bishopgate, London.  They lived at Park Road and also Edwin Place, Peckham, producing seven sons and two daughters.  As a qualified architect, William practiced in London until 1851, when he and his family boarded the barque Midlothian at Gravesend and set sail for New Zealand.

The Beatsons arrived in Lyttleton on 8 October 1851, resting briefly in Christchurch, before sailing to Nelson.  William and Maria's third daughter, Catherine Alice Beatson (1851–1925), was born soon after their arrival in Nelson.  William moved to Stoke, initially attempting to farm, before returning to architecture in 1857. During the unsuccessful farming venture, William completed his first New Zealand building project, "Guthrie Grange". This became his home and office from 1854 until 1866 when an increasing workload necessitated his move to an office in Nelson. He died at his home at Selwyn Place, Nelson, on 13 January 1870.  William's sons, William Ford Beatson (1833–1904) and Charles Edward Beatson (1846–1927) followed their father into his profession and successive generations have all produced at least one architect.

Architectural career 
During the late 1820s, William was articled to the prominent architect and surveyor, John Wallen and upon Wallen's recommendation; he was admitted to the Royal Academy in 1832. His time at the academy would have given him a deeper appreciation of the Classical and Gothic architecture. 
During the early 1830s, John Wallen, William Wallen and William Beatson formed a partnership which lasted at least until 1836 when the firm "Wallen, Son and Beatson" provided a substantial estimate for repairs to Christ Church in Spitalfields.  During 1838, William Wallen was commencing his new practice in Yorkshire and this is probably about the time Beatson also left the partnership to begin his own practice at 3 Bartholomew Lane. 
 
Few records exist of Beatson's work in London; however, the Alexander Turnbull Library in Wellington holds his drawings for a proposed school room for Streatham Church (1844), Cornbury Place, Old Kent Road (1846), and the Surrey Canal School, Rotherhithe (1849). Beatson completed Saint Paul's Chapel of Ease, Rotherhithe (consecrated in 1850), before his departure to New Zealand.

Beatson understood the desire of his fellow settlers to retain the comfort of "Englishness" in their new homeland. However, he also understood the challenges and advantages of the New Zealand environment. This was a land prone to earthquakes that could damage, if not destroy, buildings built from stone; but unlike Victorian Britain, New Zealand had an abundance of timber. Beatson was probably persuaded by the Gothic revival that was influencing many of his contemporaries in England, therefore, his new work often utilised carved timber columns. However, instead of the traditional use of stone, he developed his own weatherboard walls to infill and brace his structures.

William Beatson was Nelson's most prolific architect. His contributions included the Wesleyan Church, additions to Christ Church Cathedral (1859), the Union Bank of Australia, the Anglican Church at Richmond, St Barnabas Church at Stoke and several residences. He also designed several commercial buildings; his first project being a warehouse and offices for Morrison and Sclanders in Hardy Street (1863). Beatson's commercial buildings reflected a familiarity with the Italianate style that he acquired while working with Wallen.

In 1859, Beatson was engaged to design Nelson College. Constrained by a budget and also torn between the potential risk to such a large number of students in the event of fire or earthquake, Beatson opted for a wooden building in a modest Jacobian style.  The college was completed in 1861, but it was destroyed by fire in 1904 and the handsome new brick replacement was seriously damaged in the 1929 Murchison earthquake. This building was eventually replaced with a concrete structure.

References 

1807 births
1870 deaths
Year of birth unknown
Architects from Surrey
New Zealand architects
British emigrants to New Zealand
19th-century English architects